Garnham Blaxcell (1778-3 October 1817) was a merchant and trader in the colony of New South Wales, Australia.

References

1778 births
1817 deaths